The 2020–21 UMBC Retrievers men's basketball team represented the University of Maryland, Baltimore County in the 2020–21 NCAA Division I men's basketball season. The Retrievers, led by fifth-year head coach Ryan Odom, played their home games at the UMBC Event Center in Catonsville, Maryland as members of the America East Conference. In a season limited due to the ongoing COVID-19 pandemic, the Retrievers finished the season 14–6, 10–4 in America East play to finish in a tie for first place. They lost to UMass Lowell in the semifinals of the America East tournament.

Following the season, Odom left the school to accept the head coaching position at Utah State. On April 12, 2021, the school named former Duquesne and Penn State head coach Jim Ferry as the team's new head coach.

Previous season
The Retrievers finished the 2019–20 season 16–17, 8–8 in America East play to finish in a tie for fourth place. They defeated New Hampshire in the quarterfinals of the America East tournament before losing in the semifinals to Vermont.

Roster

Schedule and results

|-
!colspan=12 style=| Non-conference regular season

|-
!colspan=12 style=| America East Conference regular season

|-
!colspan=12 style=| America East tournament
|-

Source

References

UMBC Retrievers men's basketball seasons
UMBC Retrievers
UMBC Retrievers men's basketball
UMBC Retrievers men's basketball